Saara hardwickii, commonly known as Hardwicke's spiny-tailed lizard or the Indian spiny-tailed lizard is a species of lizard in the family Agamidae. The species is found in patches across the Thar desert, Kutch, and surrounding arid zones in India and Pakistan. It is mainly herbivorous and lives in numbers in some areas. Since it is found in loose clusters it often attracts predators such as raptors. It is also hunted by local peoples in the belief that the fat extracted from it is an aphrodisiac.

Taxonomy and etymology
Traditionally the species S. hardwickii was placed in the genus Uromastyx, but in 2009 it was moved to the genus Saara together with the closely related species S. asmussi and S. loricata.

The specific name, hardwickii, commemorates English naturalist Thomas Hardwicke who brought illustrations of the species from which J.E. Gray described it.

It has been suggested that Uromastyx sensu lato along with the sister group of Leiolepis may be considered as a distinct family, the Uromastycidae, however this is not widely accepted as the rest of the Agamidae do not form a clear sister group.

Geographic range
The type locality for S. hardwickii is Kanauj district in Uttar Pradesh.  It inhabits the dry desert tracts of the northern half of the plains of India into Pakistan. It ranges from Uttar Pradesh in the east to Rajasthan in the West and the Kachchh area of Gujarat. The hot Thar desert is the stronghold of this species and are found extensively in the Jaisalmer, Bikaner, Barmer and Churu districts in Rajasthan. It is also found in some parts of Madhya Pradesh (Rewa).

Local names
Gujarati: sandho
Hindi-Urdu: sana
Konkani: gaar
Punjabi: sanda
Rajasthani: sanda
Pashto: khadmai
Sindhi: patt machi

Description

Hardwicke's spiny-tailed lizard has a rounded head with a flat snout. It is usually yellowish brown, sandy or olive in colour. It may have black spots and vermiculations and a distinctive black spot on the front of the thigh. It has a dorso-ventrally flattened body with wrinkled skin. Its tail has whorls of spiny scales with large spines on the side. The tail is bluish-grey (in Jaisalmer) to sand-coloured (in Kutch).

The colour of the lizard varies and darker colours are seen during the colder seasons.

Sexual dimorphism
The  male  has a longer tail than the female and pronounced femoral pores.

Photo gallery 

 A juvenile Laggar Falcon had just caught a spiny tailed lizard saara Hardwickii. It is about to start consuming the lizard. These lizards are a huge part of their diet in certain areas of Rajasthan, India.

Habits
Generally found in firm ground rather than pure sand dunes, Hardwicke's spiny-tailed lizard is often found living in colonies, sometimes on the outskirts of villages. It prefers elevated patches of land especially in Kutch where it is invariably found on isolated patches of high ground (called Bets) above the monsoon water level. Also found in Sindh at Kohistan area surrounding Karachi and Thana Bula Khan.

Birds of prey are a major predator of the lizard in the desert. The saker falcon (Falco cherrug) has been recorded in literature but the  tawny eagle (Aquila rapax) and other falcons such as the laggar (Falco jugger) also prey on these lizards. The cattle egret has also been known to prey on it.

Burrow
The tunnel has an entrance which is flush with the ground and ends in a small chamber. S. hardwickii is solitary in the burrow, but hatchlings may stay with the mother initially.

The lizard basks close to the entrance of its burrow. It is very alert and smoothly slides into its burrow at the first hint of danger. The spiny-tailed hibernates through the winter and emerges in spring. By the time it is ready for hibernation, the lizard puts on long strips of fat on each side of the backbone which presumably enables it to survive the long winter months.
Projected agricultural growth would cause considerable declines of Hardwicke's spiny-tailed lizard (>20%) populations.

Food
Hardwicke's spiny-tailed lizard is largely herbivorous and its teeth are adapted for a plant diet which comprises the flowers and fruits of the kair (Capparis aphylla); the beans of khejri (Prosopis spicigera); the fruit of Salvadora persica, and grass. In locust-breeding areas the spiny tailed lizard has been known to feed on nymphs and adults of the locust.

In summer it tends to forage more in the mornings feeding to a greater extent on insects, and in the monsoons it feeds principally on herbs and grasses.

Breeding biology
Hardwicke's spiny-tailed lizard breeds in spring after emerging from hibernation. It lays white, pigeon-sized eggs.

Economic importance
In India S. hardwickii is caught for its meat, about which Malcolm Smith says "... with certain castes of Hindus it is a regular article of diet ... the meat is said to be excellent and white like chicken ... the head and feet are not eaten, but the tail is considered a great delicacy ... the fat of the body is boiled down and the resulting oil is used as an embrocation and also as a cure for impotence."

The fat stored in the tail of the lizard is purported to have medicinal properties and for this reason, this lizard is often illegally collected and sold in various parts of India and Pakistan for folk medicine. It is kept in captivity by the cruel practice of dislocating the backbone.

Poaching
Hardwicke's spiny-tailed lizard is on the verge of extinction in western Rajasthan due to rampant poaching by nomads, who value this reptile both for its meat and as a medicine. During the monsoon, this lizard leaves its burrow and comes out to feed on tender shoots of grass, at which time it falls prey to raptors.

References

Further reading

Hardwicke T, Gray JE (1827). "A Synopsis of the Species of Saurian Reptiles, collected in India by Major-General Hardwicke". Zool. J. London 3: 214-229. (Uromastix hardwickii, new species, pp. 219-220). (in Latin and English).
Vyas, Raju (1990). "Notes on capture of the Spiny-tailed lizard (Uromastyx hardwickii) in Gujarat". Hamadryad 15: 28.
Daniel JC (2002). The Book of Indian Reptiles and Amphibians. Mumbai: Bombay Natural History Society.
Smith, Malcolm A. (1935). The Fauna of British India, Including Ceylon and Burma. Reptilia and Amphibia. Vol. II.—Sauria. London: Secretary of State for India in Council. (Taylor and Francis, printers). xiii + 440 pp. + Plate I + 2 maps. (Uromastix hardwickii, pp. 244-247).

External links

Digital morphology

Saara (lizard)
Reptiles of India
Reptiles of Pakistan
Taxa named by John Edward Gray
Reptiles described in 1827